Laurent Roussey (born 27 December 1961) is a French football manager and former player, who played as a striker. He was most recently manager of Lyon-Duchère.

Career
On 22 October 2013, Roussey joined FC Sion as manager for the third time.

Without a club since July 2017, he joined an academy in Africa to take care of coaching a team under 19 years old. In May 2019 he returned to management with Lyon-Duchère. In February 2020 he was sacked by the club.

Honours

Player
Saint-Étienne
French championship: 1981

Manager 
Sion
Swiss Cup: 2010–11

References

External links
 
 
 Career summary
 Laurent Roussey at Soccerway
 Laurent Roussey y Gerard Russo se incorporan a la academia como supervisor y entrenador del juvenil A

1961 births
Living people
Footballers from Nîmes
French footballers
France international footballers
Association football forwards
AS Saint-Étienne players
Toulouse FC players
SC Toulon players
Olympique Alès players
FC Lausanne-Sport players
Red Star F.C. players
Ligue 1 players
French football managers
FC Rouen managers
US Créteil-Lusitanos managers
FC Sion managers
AS Saint-Étienne managers
FC Lausanne-Sport managers
Ligue 1 managers